El Nacional may refer to:

Newspapers
El Nacional (Argentina), a newspaper in Argentina
El Nacional (Barcelona), an online newspaper in Spain
El Nacional (Bolivia), a newspaper in Bolivia
El Nacional (Mexico), a newspaper in Mexico
El Nacional (Paraguay), a newspaper in Paraguay
El Nacional (Santo Domingo), a newspaper in the Dominican Republic
El Nacional (Venezuela), a newspaper in Venezuela

Other
Club Deportivo El Nacional, an association football team in Ecuador

See also
Nacional (disambiguation)

Lists of newspapers